Nevada Mills is an unincorporated community in Jamestown Township, Steuben County, in the U.S. state of Indiana.

History
A post office was established at Nevada Mills in 1867, and remained in operation until 1905. An old variant name of the community was called Millville.

Geography

References

Unincorporated communities in Steuben County, Indiana
Unincorporated communities in Indiana